Mario Aerts (born 31 December 1974 in Herentals, Belgium) is a former professional road bicycle racer, who competed between 1996 and 2011. He competed for three teams; Vlaanderen 2002,  and the Lotto team through various sponsorships, competing with that particular team for twelve seasons during his career. During this time he raced in the Tours de France, the Giro d'Italia, and the Vuelta a España. In the 2007 cycling season, he finished in these three major stage races in cycling. He was only the 25th racer in the history of cycling to achieve this.

Aerts won the Grand Prix d'Isbergues in 1996, Circuit Franco Belge in 2001, the Giro della Provincia di Lucca in 2001, and most notably La Flèche Wallonne in 2002; he did not win a professional race after that. In June 2011, he announced his retirement as a professional cyclist at the end of the year, citing heart problems as the major cause. After retiring he would become an assistant for the team he rode for under its present name: Lotto-Soudal.

Major results

1994
1st, Stage 6 Tour de Wallonie
1995
2nd Overall Tour de Wallonie
1996
1st Grand Prix d'Isbergues
1997
1st Overall Circuit Franco-Belge
Mountains Competition
1999
3rd La Flèche Wallonne
3rd Overall Route du Sud
21st Overall Tour de France
2000
5th La Flèche Wallonne
28th Overall Tour de France
2001
27th Overall Tour de France
1st Overall Giro della Provincia di Lucca
2002
1st La Flèche Wallonne
2005
15th Overall Vuelta a España
2006
3rd Overall Settimana internazionale di Coppi e Bartali
2007
20th Overall Giro d'Italia
70th Overall Tour de France
28th Overall Vuelta a España
2008
31st Overall Tour de France
8th Men's Olympics road race

References

External links

1974 births
Living people
Belgian male cyclists
Cyclists at the 2008 Summer Olympics
Olympic cyclists of Belgium
People from Herentals
Cyclists from Antwerp Province